Briggsia was a genus in the family Gesneriacae that consisted of 22 species of herbaceous perennials, native to the Himalayas, China and Vietnam. The genus is no longer recognized, with all of its member species having been relocated to other genera, including Glabrella, Loxostigma, and Oreocharis.

These rhizomous plants are rarely branched. Leaves are few to many, crowded at the tips. Flowers are bell-shaped, 2-3 cm long and 1-2 cm in diameter, with 2-lipped petals in blue, purple, red, orange, or white, and spotted within.

The genus is named in honour of Munro Briggs Scott.

Species
Former species included:

Briggsia acutiloba K.Y.Pan
Briggsia agnesiae (Forrest ex W.W.Sm.) Craib
Briggsia amabilis (Diels) Craib
Briggsia aurantiaca B.L.Burtt
Briggsia chienii Chun
Briggsia dongxingensis Chun ex K.Y.Pan
Briggsia elegantissima (Lév. & Vaniot) Craib
Briggsia forrestii Craib
Briggsia humilis K.Y.Pan
Briggsia kurzii (C.B.Clarke) W.E.Evans
Briggsia latisepala Chun ex K.Y.Pan
Briggsia leiophylla
Briggsia longicaulis W.T.Wang & K.Y.Pan
Briggsia longifolia Craib
Briggsia longipes (Hemsl. ex Oliv.) Craib
Briggsia mairei Craib
Briggsia mihieri (Franch.) Craib
Briggsia parvifolia K.Y.Pan
Briggsia pinfaensis (Lév.) Craib
Briggsia rosthornii (Diels) B.L.Burtt
Briggsia speciosa (Hemsl.) Craib
Briggsia stewardii Chun

References

Gesneriaceae
Historically recognized angiosperm genera